The Roman Catholic Diocese of Gurk-Klagenfurt is a Catholic diocese covering the Austrian state of Carinthia. It is part of the ecclesiastical province of Salzburg. Though named after Gurk Cathedral, the bishop's see since 1787 is in Klagenfurt.

Due to the presence of Carinthian Slovenes, the organizational structures of the diocese are bilingual. The Slovene language is, together with German, the language of church services in 69 southern parishes of the diocese.

History

Middle Ages

In 1072 a suffragan bishopric in the Duchy of Carinthia, subordinate to the Archdiocese of Salzburg, was erected by Archbishop Gebhard of Salzburg, with the authorization of Pope Alexander II (21 March 1070) and Emperor Henry IV (4 February 1072). It could rely on the properties of a former nunnery in Gurk founded by Countess Hemma in 1043. The first bishop installed was the local noble Günther von Krapffeld (1072–1090). The episcopal residence was not in Gurk, but at nearby Strassburg Castle.

Initially the Gurk bishops only held the rights of vicars, while the right of appointment, consecration, and investiture was reserved to the Salzburg archbishop. The diocese served as a model for later Salzburg establishments like the Bishopric of Chiemsee (1216), the Diocese of Seckau (1218), and the Diocese of Lavant (1228). Not until 1123 Archbishop Conrad I of Salzburg founded a cathedral chapter at Gurk, which under Bishop Roman I (1132–1167) obtained the right to elect the bishop. The boundaries of the diocese were only defined in 1131. Originally the territory embraced was small, but the jurisdiction of the Bishop of Gurk extended beyond the limits of his diocese, inasmuch as he was also vicar-general of that part of Carinthia under the Archbishop of Salzburg. The rights of a secular Vogt advocate were held by the Carinthian dukes.

After a contest of a hundred years the metropolitan regained the right of appointment. Dissensions did not cease, for in 1432 the Habsburg duke Frederick IV of Austria claimed the right of investiture, which even was a subject of the consultations at the Council of Basel under Pope Eugene IV. In 1448 King Frederick IV of Germany concluded an agreement with Pope Nicholas V to reserve the right of appointment for himself and when in 1470 Sixtus of Tannberg was appointed Gurk bishop by the Salzburg chapter, Frederick enforced his resignation four years later. Finally, on 25 October 1535, the Archbishop of Salzburg and former Gurk bishop, Matthäus Lang von Wellenburg, concluded a long-lasting agreement with King Ferdinand I of Germany, according to which the nomination of the Bishop of Gurk is to rest twice in succession with the sovereign and every third time with the Archbishop of Salzburg; under all circumstances the archbishop was to retain the right of confirmation, consecration and investiture. Though from 1460 onwards the Gurk bishops held the right to bear the title of a prince-bishop, they never exerted any secular power.

Modern times
In 1761 Count Hieronymus von Colloredo was appointed Bishop of Gurk by Archbishop Sigismund von Schrattenbach, whom Colloredo succeeded in 1771. Under Bishop Joseph Franz Auersperg, a dedicated follower of Josephinism, the Gurk diocese received an accession of territory by Emperor Joseph II in 1775, and again in 1786. Nevertheless the present extent of the diocese, embracing the whole of Carinthia, dates only from its reconstitution in 1859. The episcopal residence was transferred in 1787 to the capital of Carinthia, Klagenfurt. A prominent modern prince-bishop was Valentin Wiery (1858–1880).

According to the census of 1906, the Catholic population of the diocese was 369,000, of whom three-fourths were German and the rest Slovenes. The 24 deaneries embraced 345 parishes. The cathedral chapter at Klagenfurt consisted of three mitred dignitaries; five honorary and five stipendiary canons. Among the institutions of religious orders the Benedictine Abbey of St. Paul (founded in 1091; suppressed in 1782; restored in 1807) holds first place. There were also Jesuits at Klagenfurt and St. Andrä; Dominicans at Friesach; Capuchins at Klagenfurt and Wolfsberg; Franciscans at Villach; Olivetans at Tanzenberg; Servites at Kötsehach; Brothers of Mercy at St. Veit on the Glan (in charge of an immense hospital founded in 1877); and a number of religious communities of women for the care of the sick and the instruction of youth.

The clergy are trained in the episcopal seminary at Klagenfurt, which has been, since 1887, under the direction of the Jesuits. The professors are Benedictines from the Abbey of Saint Paul and Jesuits. The education of aspirants to the priesthood is provided for at Klagenfurt, in a preparatory seminary established by Bishop Wiery in 1860 and enlarged by Bishop Kahn. At Saint Paul's the Benedictines conduct a private gymnasium with the privileges of a government school. At Klagenfurt there is also a Catholic teachers' seminary under ecclesiastical supervision.

Churches
Chief among the examples of ecclesiastical architecture, both in point of age and artistic interest, is Gurk Cathedral, which dates back to the beginnings of the diocese, having been completed about 1220. Also worthy of note are the Romanesque church and cloister of Millstatt Abbey and, as monuments of Gothic architecture, the parish churches at Bad Sankt Leonhard im Lavanttal, Heiligenblut, Villach, Völkermarkt, St Wolfgang ob Grades (Metnitz), and Waitschach (Hüttenberg). One of the largest and most beautiful churches of Carinthia is the Dominican Church at Friesach. The Klagenfurt Cathedral was built in 1591 during the Protestant Reformation; in 1604 it was acquired by the Jesuits, and consecrated in honour of the Apostles Saints Peter and Paul.

Prominent among the places of pilgrimage in the diocese is Maria Saal, visited annually by from 15,000 to 20,000 pilgrims. Among Catholic associations special mention should be made of those for the advancement of the Catholic Press and for the diffusion of good books: for the German population, the St. Joseph's Verein founded at Klagenfurt in 1893, and the St. Joseph's Book Confraternity; for the Slovenes, the St. Hermagoras Verein, established in 1852 (1860), with its headquarters at Klagenfurt, and widely established among Slovenes in other dioceses.

Special churches
 Former Cathedrals:
 Sankt Andrä, Kärnten
 Assumption of Mary provost and pilgrimage church, Maria Saal
 Minor Basilica:
 Maria Luggau (Our Lady of the Snows), Lesachtal

Deaneries

Bleiburg (Pliberk)
Eberndorf (Dobrla vas)
Feldkirchen
Ferlach (Borovlje)
Friesach
Gmünd-Millstatt
Greifenburg
Gurk
Hermagor (Šmohor)
Klagenfurt-Stadt
Klagenfurt-Land (Celovec-dežela)
Kötschach
Krappfeld
Obervellach
Rosegg (Rožek)
Sankt Andrä
Sankt Veit an der Glan
Spittal an der Drau
Tainach (Tinje)
Villach-Land (Beljak-dežela)
Villach-Stadt
Völkermarkt (Velikovec)
Wolfsberg

Notable bishops

Sixtus of Tannberg (1470–1474)
Raymond Peraudi (1491–1505)
Cardinal Matthäus Lang von Wellenburg (1505–1522)
Hieronymus Balbus (1522–1526)
Sigismund Francis, Archduke of Austria (1653–1665)
Archbishop Count Hieronymus von Colloredo (1761–1772)
Cardinal Joseph Franz Auersperg (1772–1783)
Valentin Wiery (1858–1880)

See also
Roman Catholicism in Austria

References and notes

External links

 GCatholic.org 
 Catholic Hierarchy 
  Diocese website
 

Roman Catholic dioceses in Austria
Roman Catholic dioceses established in the 11th century
Gurk, Roman Catholic Diocese of
Maria Saal